Rungu is a territory and a locality of Haut-Uele province in the Democratic Republic of the Congo.

Settlements include Rungu and Nangazizi.

References 

Territories of Haut-Uélé Province